Concierto Barroco is a piece of music written in 2007 by the Bulgarian composer Gheorghi Arnaoudov, scored for violin and orchestra.

Composition 
Concierto Barroco is a musical mystery, an interpretation of the famous homonymous novel by the Cuban novelist Alejo Carpentier. A composition which takes us to the early 18th-century Christmas holidays and the Carnival of Venice, to an imaginary surrealistic meeting between Vivaldi, Händel, Domenico Scarlatti, and an unnamed Mexican nobleman, along with his servant Felomeno and the ghosts of Wagner and Stravinsky. This peculiar acoustic space is a play of interweaving ornaments, details, gestures, images and voices, floating somewhere between the waters of Tenochtitlan, the silver glimmerings of Taxco and the boundless expanses of the Venetian channels, halls, galleries, graveyards and tiny streets, populated with the never failing wealth of colours, aromas, shadows and rhymes, silhouettes and clamour, forming a complex, ever-changing sound fabric, games of instrumental passages, variations and quasi quotations of unnamed manuscripts from Spanish monasteries, old late-gothic or renaissance masters, the way that I heard and translated them in the meaning of one infinite sound palimpsest.

Performance 
After the premier performance of the composition in Estoril, Portugal in 2007, Arnaoudov added for its first recording in 2011 a specially written cadenzas for the virtuoso violinist Mario Hossen and the Orpheus Academy Orchestra of New Bulgarian University.

References

Arnaoudov